Engineering Colleges were introduced in 2002 as part of the Specialist Schools Programme in England. The system enabled secondary schools to specialise in certain fields, in this case engineering. Schools that successfully applied to the Specialist Schools Trust and became Engineering Colleges received extra funding for teaching from this joint private sector and government scheme. Engineering Colleges act as a local point of reference for other schools and businesses in the area. Schools can currently become Engineering Colleges through the Dedicated Schools Grant or by becoming an academy. This is because the Specialist Schools Programme has been defunct since 2011.

List of specialist engineering colleges

References

External links
Specialist Schools Trust

2002 in education
2002 introductions
Engineering education in the United Kingdom
Specialist schools programme

hi:इंजीनियरी महाविद्यालय
ta:பொறியியல் மற்றும் தொழிநுட்பவியல் கல்லூரி